The Ministry of Social Welfare, Relief and Resettlement administers Burma's social welfare, social relief and resettlement affairs.

The Ministry of Social Welfare, Relief and Resettlement is currently led by Thet Thet Khine, who was appointed by SAC chairman Min Aung Hlaing on 4 February 2021.

Ministers

Departments
Union Minister Office
Department of Social Welfare
Department of Disaster Management
Department of Rehabilitation

See also
 Cabinet of Burma

References

External links
 Official website

SocialWelfareReliefResettlement
Myanmar